The Torodbe; singular Torodo{{efn|From the Fula (Pulaar): toorodɓe or tooroɓɓe, singular toorooɗo}} (also called Turudiyya, Banu Toro, Takrur, Toronkawa) were Muslim clerics and theocratic monarchs who reigned in Futa Toro, a region located in the north of present-day Senegal, from the seventeenth to the early twentieth century.

Origins

The Torodbe originated in Futa Toro from as early as the 9th to as late as 13th century, later spreading throughout the Fulbe territories.
Futa Toro was a strip of agricultural land along the Senegal River. 

They may well have been a distinct group by the fifteenth century, when the Denianke conquered Futa Toro.
In the last quarter of the seventeenth century the Zawaya reformer Nasir al-Din launched a jihad to restore purity of religious observance in the Futa Tooro.  
He gained support from the Torodbe clerical clan against the warriors, but by 1677 the movement had been defeated. 
After this defeat, some of the Torodbe migrated south to Bundu and some continued on to the Fouta Djallon.

Organization

The Torodbe at first recruited members from all levels of Sūdānī society, particularly the poorer people.
Torodbe clerics included people whose origin was Fula, Wolof, Mande, Hausa and Berber.
However, they spoke the Fula language, married into Fulbe families, and became the Fulbe scholarly caste. 
As with the Zawaya and Mandé clerisies, the early Torodbe clerics were looked down upon by the warrior groups in their societies, 
which usually had little interest in Islam.
The Torodbe originally lived on charity, as shown by sayings such as "the Torodo is a beggar" and "if the calabash did not exist, the Torodo would not survive".
The term Torodo is derived from tooraade, meaning "to ask for alms."
The Torodbe lived in settled communities and would not follow any caste-based trade such as being fishermen, smiths, weavers or tanners.

The jihads launched by the Torodbe leaders were in response to declines in Islamic practices coupled with oppression by the ruling classes. They aimed to eliminate relics of traditional religious beliefs, and to elevate Islam from a personal belief into the law of the land, creating theocratic states. 
After they had taken power it was at first thought that the Torodbe would eventually eliminate obstacles to social movement, perhaps even freeing the slaves.  A person would achieve status through Islamic learning and observance of Islamic precepts.
In practice, particularly in Futa Toro and Bundu, the Torodbe evolved into a closed society limited to a small number of families. 
The social stratification between slaves and free people, and between different hereditary occupations, remained unchanged.

The Torodbe established schools where students were taught in the Arabic language.
The mosques they erected in the main towns became the center of religious and.scholarly activity, and also were often administrative centers. 
Tithes were levied on harvests and inheritances to support the state.
The imam headed both the religious and the political organization.
He delegated responsibility for security to the amirs who ran the police and army.
The Torodbe intelligentsia of the seventeenth and eighteenth centuries were by no means cut off in a backwater. Some of them undertook the pilgrimage to Mecca, and then spent many years in countries such as Egypt where they absorbed a sophisticated understanding of the world and of Islamic thought.  They brought this knowledge back with them.
Within the Western Sudan, Torodbe clerics would maintain long-distance correspondence over long periods of time.

The religious shaykhs would live on payments they were given in their official or judicial roles, or from fees for their religious services. A shaykh would take care of children while they learned the Quran, but the children were expected to work or beg for the shaykh during this period. 
Other Torodbe lived through farming or herding, although the work was left to inferiors. 
Wealth was accumulated in the form of slaves, firearms, cloth and hardware.
Some scholastic dynasties emerged from the Torodbe, including Shaykh 'Uthmān's Toronkawa, Shaykh Ahmadu's Bari and al-Haji 'Umar's Tall.

Senegambia

The Torodbe provided leadership for the early jihads in Futa Toro, Futa Bundu and Futa Jallon in the region around the Senegambian region.

Bundu

The Torodbe Mālik Sī launched one of the first of the jihads towards the end of the seventeenth century in Bundu.
Mālik Sī was born into a Torodbe family around 1637 near Podor in Futa Toro.
He received formal Islamic training in what is now southern Mauritania.
He married, and traveled from place to place trying to live by selling amulets.
Malik Dauda Sy founded the state of Bundu in the 1690s. The Muslim rulers had authority over village chiefs, whom they could appoint or dismiss. 
He was succeeded by Bubu Malik, who died around 1715.
Bundu then entered a period of anarchy as the state's neighbors launched attacks while the different communities of Torodbe asserted their autonomy.
For a time during the eighteenth century Bundu reverted to pagan rule, but by that time most of the population were Muslim.

Jallon

The Torodbe influenced the Fulbe of the Futa Jallon, their kinsmen, in embracing a more militant form of Islam.
A jihad was launched in the Futa Jallon around 1726 or 1727.
The movement was primarily religious, and its leaders included both Mandé and Fulbe marabouts.  
Karamokho Alfa was elected leader of the jihad.
He took the title almami, or "the Imam".
Under his leadership the Imamate of Futa Jallon became the first Muslim state to be founded by the Fulbe.
In 1751 Ibrahim Sori succeeded Karamokho Alfa.  After many years of conflict, Ibrahim Sori achieved a decisive victory in 1776 that consolidated the power of the Fulbe state. The jihad had achieved its goals and Ibrahim Sori assumed the title of almami.

Toro

The farmers of Futa Toro continued to suffer from attacks by nomads from what is now Mauritania.
The jihad in Futa Jalon was followed by a jihad in Futa Toro between 1769 and 1776 led by Sulaymān Baal.
In 1776 the Torodbe threw out the ruling Denianke Dynasty.
Sulayman died in 1776 and was succeeded by 'Abd al-Qadir, a learned teacher and judge who had studied in Cayor. 

Abdul Kader became the first Almamy of the theocratic Almamyate of Futa Toro.
He encouraged construction of mosques, and pursued an aggressive policy towards his neighbors.  
The Torodbe prohibited the trade in slaves on the river.  In 1785 they obtained an agreement from the French to no longer trade in Muslim slaves and to pay customs duties to the state. Abdul Kader defeated the emirates of Trarza and Brakna to the north, but was defeated and captured when he attacked the Wolof states of Cayor and Waalo.  After his release the jihad impetus had been lost.  By his death in 1806 the state was dominated by a few elite Torodbe families.
Almamys continued to be enthroned in Futa Toro throughout the nineteenth century, but the position had become ceremonial by then.

French colonial rule

By the mid-nineteenth century, the Torodbe almamis in Senegambia had become hereditary oligarchies that imposed a harsh and oppressive rule on the people. The French provided political and economic support to the Torodbe leaders, who in return let the French build fortified posts along the Senegal valley.Jihad leaders in the region who followed the Torodbe revolutionary tradition in the late nineteenth century included Maba Diakhou Bâ in the Gambia, Mahmadu Lamine in Senegal and Samori Ture who founded the short-lived Wassoulou Empire in what is now Guinea. These men attempted to overthrow the Europeans and their allies in the cause of Islam, but were eventually defeated by superior forces.

Eastern states

In the nineteenth century several Muslim states arose to the east of Senegambia in the Sahel region along the Niger River.
The most illustrious leaders to emerge from the Torodbe movement were Usman dan Fodio, who created the Islamic Sokoto Caliphate, 
and El Hadj Umar Tall who created the short-lived Toucouleur Empire.

Sokoto Caliphate

The largest of the Fulani jihads was led by the Torodbe scholar Usman dan Fodio and established the Sokoto Caliphate in 1808, 
stretching across what is now the north of Nigeria.
Usman dan Fodio, the Shehu, was born into a Torodbe clan in 1754 near Galmi in northern Hausaland.
His family were originally Fulbe nomadic cattle herders who had probably come to Hausaland from the west in the fifteenth century.

Usman dan Fodio learned the Quran by heart. He learned Arabic grammar, verse and metrics and basic Maliki law.
He studied rhetoric, history and literature, and became a fluent and educated writer of Arabic.
In his early years, Usman dan Fodio was an itinerant mallam, teaching a message of reform against illegal taxation, corruption, pagan ceremonies, unqualified mallams and other abuses and departures from strict Islamic practice. 

In 1804 Usman dan Fodio launched a jihad against Gobir which lasted about four years and ended in victory for the Muslims.
Shaykh Mukhtar al-Kunti (1729-1811) was an immensely influential reformer who led the Qadiriyya tariqah in West Africa. Shaykh Usman dan Fodio looked up to him as a teacher, and Shaykh Mukhtar reportedly threw his support behind Shaykh Usman in his Sokoto campaign, saying "Usman ibn Fudi is one of the accomplished saints; his djihad is just."
Usman established the capital of his new empire in Sokoto.  After some inconclusive fighting with the state of Bornu, the jihad wound down by 1810.  The Shehu divided his conquests between his brother and his son, and spent the remainder of his life in study and teaching.  He died in 1817.
The Sokoto Caliphate survived until the British conquest in 1903, when it lost political power. 
The Sultan of Sokoto is still an important religious figure.  When Sa'adu Abubakar was elected Sultan in 2006 he became formal head of the 70 million Muslims in Nigeria.

Massina
The Fulbe Muslim state of Masina was established to the south of Timbuktu in 1818.
Seku Amadu (Shaykh Ahmad Lobbo) was born in a poor family around 1773 at Malanga in the Segu Empire province of Massina. He was pious, honest and unassuming, and became deeply interested in religion, attracting many followers who were influenced by the Islamic movement in Sokoto.
In 1816 Uthman dan Fodio gave him the title of Shaykh, and in 1818 he led a revolt against the local rulers.

Early success against the Segu army led to mass conversions of the Fulbe people, and Massina quickly became a strong Muslim state, 
although warfare with Segu continued for many years.
In 1826 the new state took Timbuktu, which was held by Massina until Seku Ahmadu died in 1845.
In the conquered territories, fortified Torodbe villages were established to maintain the peace.

Liptako Emirate

The Liptako Emirate was an early 19th-century Fulani Islamic state in the region where today's Burkina Faso, Mali and Niger meet.  
At first part of Massina, in 1824 it rebelled and became independent until the French arrived in 1864.
Brahima Saidu led the revolt, and his family retained power. 
The Torodbe, who had opposed the revolt, were given the role of forming an electoral college that would select the amir based on his personal merit, proven abilities, family connections and other factors.  One of the Torodbe would swathe the head of newly chosen amir in a turban.

Toucouleur Empire

Around 1827, the Torodbe cleric 'Umar Tall left Futa Toro and made an extended pilgrimage to Mecca.
El Hadj 'Umar Tall returned in 1846 and began recruiting for a Jihad.
Muhammed Bello, son and heir of Uthman dan Fodio, has been attributed as the author of a poem that praises the glorious exploits of the Banu Toro. 
Al-Haji 'Umar Tall included the poem in the messages he sent to the leaders of Futa Toro when raising support for his jihad, since it showed that the powerful Fodio family supported his cause. The poem said in part:

'Umar Tall launched his jihad'' in 1852.
His forces succeeded in establishing several states in the Sudan to the east of Futa Toro, 
but the French under Major Louis Faidherbe prevented him from including Futa Toro into his empire.
'Umar was defeated by the French at Medine in 1857, losing access to the territories further down the Senegal River.  In 1860 he concluded a treaty with the French in which he recognized their supremacy in Futa Toro, while he was recognized in Kaarta and Ségou. He then launched an attack on the Muslim state of Massina. 
A coalition of Muslim states resisted, and in 1864 'Umar was defeated and killed. 
His followers set up a state based on Hamdullahi which lasted until 1893.

See also
Omar ibn Said

Notes

References

Sources

 

History of Senegal
History of Guinea
Fula history
19th-century Islam